Lisa Anthony is an Associate Professor in the Department of Computer & Information Science & Engineering (CISE) at the University of Florida. She is also the director of the Intelligent Natural Interaction Technology Laboratory (INIT Lab). Her research interests revolve around developing natural user interfaces to allow for greater human-computer interaction, specifically for children as they develop their cognitive and physical abilities.

Education 
Lisa Anthony earned her B.S. and M.S. in computer science with official concentrations in artificial intelligence, human-computer Interaction, and software engineering at Drexel University. Her M.S. thesis involved using genetic programming to evolve board evaluation functions for the strategy board game Acquire. As a summer graduate intern, she worked on the Collaborative Exploratory Search project at the Fuji-Xerox Palo Alto Laboratory (FXPAL).

In 2008, she earned her Ph.D. from the Human Computer Interaction Institute in the School of Computer Science at Carnegie Mellon University in 2008. Her Ph.D. thesis focused on developing handwriting-based systems for algebra equation-solving.

Career 
Anthony was also a Post-Doctoral Research Associate, then a Research Assistant Professor in the Department of Information Systems at the University of Maryland, Baltimore County. She worked on advanced user interface technologies as a senior member of the engineering staff at the User-Centered Interfaces Group at Lockheed Martin Advanced Technology Laboratories. She is an currently an  Associate Professor in the Department of Computer & Information Science & Engineering at University of Florida.

Awards and honors 

National Science Foundation CAREER Award, 2016-2020
 HWCOE Undergraduate Faculty Adviser/Mentor of the Year, 2017-2018
 Special Recognition for Exceptional Reviewing, ACM Conference on Designing Interactive Systems (DIS), 2014
 Best of 2013, ACM Computing Reviews, 2013
 Best Paper Award, ACM SIGCHI Conference on Human Factors in Computing Systems (CHI), 2013
 Best Paper Award, ACM International Conference on Multimodal Interaction (ICMI), 2012

Selected publications 
Journal Articles
 
 
 
 

Book Chapters

 Anthony, L., Sharma, K., Stibler, K., Regli, S.H., Tremoulet, P. D., Gilbertson, D.G., and Gerhardt, R.T. 2010. Enabling Pre-Hospital Documentation via Spoken Language Understanding on the Modern Battlefield. In Advances in Human Factors and Ergonomics in Healthcare (Proceedings of the International Conference on Applied Human Factors & Ergonomics - AHFE’2010), ed. V.G. Duffy, CRC Press, p. 642-651

References

External links

Year of birth missing (living people)
Living people
21st-century American women scientists
American women computer scientists
Drexel University alumni
Carnegie Mellon University alumni
University of Florida faculty
Lockheed Martin people
University of Maryland, Baltimore County faculty
American computer scientists
21st-century American scientists